During its second tour to Argentina, the British Isles team, formed by English and Scottish players, played 9 matches in the country, winning all of them with more than 295 points scored and only 9 conceded.

Background

The River Plate Rugby Union (RPRU, current "Argentine Rugby Union") had formed a commission to study how to bring a British team into the country. To do so they had to have the sum of m$n 25,000 (about £ 3,000 at that time) to pay the travel and subsistence costs of a staff of twenty-five people. With contributions from clubs, newspaper companies, stores such as Gath and Chaves, British railroads and refrigerators and personal contributions, 30,000 pesos were collected. In mid-1926 the RFU received an invitation from the RPRU, requesting for a team of "first class players" to visit Argentina for three or four weeks. The delegation should be of 25 people including a manager and a referee. The RFU responded affirmatively after consulting the International Board.

On July 19, 1927, a team composed of twenty-three players from England, Scotland and Ireland under the direction of James Baxter, none other than the president of the RFU, and a first-class referee, arrived in Buenos Aires and settled in the headquarters of Hurlingham Club for a fixture of nine games.

Fulfilling the request of the RPRU, this British combined was considerably stronger than the one that had been assembled in 1910. No less than fifteen of the twenty-three players were-or were ahead-international. His captain, David MacMyn, was a leading Scottish forward who had been part of the team that won its first Grand Slam in 1925 and shared the title of the Five Nations with Ireland in 1926. During the long sea voyage to Argentina, MacMyn made good use of onboard time for his men to train and make a tactical plan for the tour.

In their first games, the Lions played an Anglo-Argentine combined and the Argentine champion San Isidro, which had won eight consecutive domestic championships to date. The Lions won those games with no goals conceded.

The following game was the first test v. Argentina, played on 31 July at Gimnasia y Esgrima stadium. It was the first time Argentina wore the horizontal light blue and white jersey (after wearing blue and white jerseys alternatively since its first match in 1910) after a proposal by Gimnasia y Esgrima executive Abelardo Gutiérrez. The match was attended by a record 12,000 spectators. After the match, MacMyn wrote: "The crowd was delighted. They were impressed by the fact that we played in silence, listening only to the captain's voice. Argentines have all the physical qualities required for rugby. They are big, strong and fast. They are tremendously enthusiastic –sometimes, excessively".

After playing Argentina, the Lions moved to the city Rosario in Santa Fe Province to play a combined team composed by players of porteños clubs Universitario and Gimnasia y Esgrima due to the impossibility of joining a competitive team with the small number of players in Rosario. Players of both teams arrived in Rosario after a long journey by train from Retiro to Rosario Norte station, the same day of the match. Held in Plaza Jewell, home venue of Club Atlético del Rosario, the Lions defeated the combined team by 24–0 in a rainy day.

The Lions returned to Buenos Aires to play the second test v. Argentina, winning 46–0 at GEBA, then playing another combined team (composed by players of Belgrano A.C. and Buenos Aires F.C.). The team would play two games more against the national team, the last of them on 21 August.

Touring team

 Manager: James "Bim" Baxter

Notes

Matches

Match summary 
The full list of matches played by the British Lions in Argentina:

 Test matches

Notes

First test

Second test

Third test

Fourth test 

Notes

Aftermath
The British Lions tour on Argentina was a huge success, with a great number of people attending the games in spite of the large defeats to the national team. The RPRU obtained a profit of almost m$n 65,000, which would be invested in mortgage titles to cost future tours with no help from the National State or other government subsidies.

In sporting terms, the tour of the British team of 1927 was of great importance for Argentine rugby, which gave a powerful boost to the expansion of the game in the country. 33 teams were registered to the Union to play at the 1927 domestic championships (four teams more than the previous edition). The boost given by the British team tour also encouraged the creation of new rugby clubs, such as Olivos in 1927 and Los Matreros one year later.

Bibliography
 Mackern, Hugo, Historia del rugby argentino 1917-1930, Buenos Aires, 1986
 Búsico, Jorge, y Cloppet, Alejandro, Ser Puma, 2° edition, Buenos Aires: Zona de Tackle, 2012
 Jones, Stephen, Behind the Lions, Edinburgh: Birlinn Ltd., 2013
 Thomas, Clem & Thomas, Greg, The British & Irish Lions Official History, Edinburgh: Mainstream, 1966, 2013

References

British Lions tour of Argentina
British & Irish Lions tours
Rugby union tours of Argentina
Bri
1926–27 in British rugby union
History of rugby union matches between Argentina and the British & Irish Lions